This is a list of English cricketers who played first-class cricket between the 1772 and 1786 English cricket seasons. This spans the period between first matches to have been given retrospective first-class status in 1772 to the formation of the Marylebone Cricket Club in 1787. A total of 67 first-class matches were played during this period.

Cricket during this period became increasingly similar to the modern game, although bowling remained underarm until the 19th century. The first Laws of Cricket had been established in 1744 and in 1774 a revision of the Laws added Leg before wicket as a mode of dismissal. The third stump was added after 1775.

Cricket scorecards became increasingly complete from 1772 onwards and the players included are those known to have played in matches which were given retrospective first-class status between 1772 and 1786 inclusive.

A

B

C

D

E

F

G

H

I

L

M

N

P

Q

R

S

T

V

W

Y

See also
 List of English cricketers to 1771
 List of English cricketers (1787–1825)
 List of English cricketers (1826–1840)
 List of English cricketers (1841–1850)
 List of English cricketers (1851–1860)
 List of English cricketers (1861–1870)
 The Cricketers of My Time by John Nyren, who played from 1787 to 1817

Notes

References
Note that CricketArchive is a subscription only website.

Bibliography
 

English cricketers 1772